Jerrell Harris (born July 8, 1989) is a former American football linebacker who attended the University of Alabama. Harris was an All-American in high school and was considered one of the better outside linebacker prospects of his class.

High school career
Harris attended Gadsden City High School in Alabama, where he was a teammate of fellow Crimson Tide players Kendall Kelly and Dre Kirkpatrick. As a senior, he registered 145 tackles (97 solo), 16 tackles for loss, three pass break-ups, 20 quarterback pressures, four caused fumbles, three recovered fumbles. Harris also returned one fumble for a touchdown and scored on an interception return. He amassed 130 tackles, three interceptions and two sacks as a junior.

Considered a four-star recruit by Rivals.com, Harris was listed as the No. 3 outside linebacker prospect in the country, behind only Nigel Bradham and Arthur Brown. Harris was also considered to be the best run stopper among all linebackers. He chose Alabama over Auburn, Tennessee and Clemson, among others.

College career
He played college football at Alabama.
As a member of the Crimson Tide, Harris was a member of two national championship teams.

Professional career

Atlanta Falcons
Harris went undrafted in the 2012 NFL Draft and was later signed out of free agency by the Atlanta Falcons.

Jacksonville Jaguars
He was signed to the Jacksonville Jaguars practice squad on September 26, 2012 and released on October 24.

New England Patriots
He was signed to the New England Patriots practice squad on November 6, 2012, a promotion to the active roster would have reunited him with former Alabama teammate, linebacker Dont'a Hightower. However, Harris was released from the New England Patriots practice squad a week later.

Oakland Raiders
He was signed by the Oakland Raiders to their practice squad on November 28, 2012.
He was released by the Oakland Raiders on May 16, 2013.

San Diego Chargers
On August 5, 2013, Harris was signed by the San Diego Chargers.

Montreal Alouettes
Harris signed with the Montreal Alouettes on October 8, 2013.

Denver Broncos
Harris, along with seven other players, were signed to future contracts with the Denver Broncos on January 22, 2014. The Broncos released him on August 24, 2014.

Detroit Lions
Harris, along with five other players, were signed to the practice squad with the Detroit Lions on September 17, 2014. He was released on November 11, 2014. He was re-signed on November 25, 2014. On August 4, 2015, Harris was released by the Lions.

Dallas Cowboys
Harris signed a reserve/futures contract with the Dallas Cowboys on January 20, 2016.

References

External links

Alabama Crimson Tide bio

1989 births
Living people
Sportspeople from Gadsden, Alabama
Players of American football from Alabama
American football linebackers
Alabama Crimson Tide football players
Under Armour All-American football players
Atlanta Falcons players
Jacksonville Jaguars players
New England Patriots players
Oakland Raiders players
San Diego Chargers players
Montreal Alouettes players
Denver Broncos players
Detroit Lions players
Dallas Cowboys players